Piz Saliente is a mountain of the Livigno Alps. Its  summit is located near the border between Italy and Switzerland. The western side of the massif (Graubünden) is part of the Swiss National Park. The eastern side of the massif (Lombardy) is part of the Stelvio National Park.

References

External links
 Piz Saliente on Hikr

Saliente
Saliente
Saliente
Italy–Switzerland border
International mountains of Europe
Mountains partially in Switzerland